The Vice-Admiral of Kent  was responsible for the defence of the county of Kent, England.

History
As a vice-admiral, the post holder was the chief of naval administration for his district. His responsibilities included pressing men for naval service, deciding the lawfulness of prizes (captured by privateers), dealing with salvage claims for wrecks and acting as a judge.

The earliest record of an appointment was of William Brooke, 10th Baron Cobham 1559–1597.

In 1863 the registrar of the Admiralty Court stated that the offices had "for many years been purely honorary" (HCA 50/24 pp. 235–6). Appointments were made by the Lord High Admiral when this officer existed. When the admiralty was in commission appointments were made by the crown by letters patent under the seal of the admiralty court.

Vice-admirals of Kent
This is a list of people who have served as Vice-Admiral of Kent.
From 1585 to 1607, a separate vice-admiral was appointed for the Hundred of Milton.

William Brooke, 10th Baron Cobham 1559–1597
The Vice-admiral of Kent was vacant 1597-1607
Sir Edward Hoby 1607–1617
Sir Francis Howard 1617–1626
Sir Thomas Walsingham 1626–1659
The Vice-admiral of Kent was vacant 1659-1668
Charles Stewart, 3rd Duke of Richmond 1668–1672
Heneage Finch, 3rd Earl of Winchilsea 1673–1687
Christopher Roper, 5th Baron Teynham 1687–1689
Henry Sydney, 1st Earl of Romney 1689–1702
Charles Finch, 4th Earl of Winchilsea 1702–1705
Lewis Watson, 1st Earl of Rockingham 1705–1724
Lionel Sackville, 1st Duke of Dorset 1725–1765
The Vice-admiral of Kent was vacant 1765-1808
John Pratt, 1st Marquess Camden 1808–1840

Vice-admirals of the Hundred of Milton
Sir Edward Hoby 1585–1607
merged with Kent

References

External links
Institute of Historical Research

Military ranks of the United Kingdom
Kent
Vice Admiral
Military history of Kent